Rockhopper may refer to:
 Rockhopper penguin, one of three closely related crested penguins
 Rockhopper, a fictional pirate penguin from the online game Club Penguin
 rockhopper, an employment law service from law firm Lewis Silkin LLP
 Rockhopper Airlines, an airline now called Blue Islands based in Alderney, Guernsey, UK
 Rockhopper Exploration, oil exploration company
 Jersey Rockhoppers, a professional ice hockey team based in West Orange, New Jersey, USA
 Rockhopper, a type of mountain bike made by Specialized Bicycle Components
 Rockhopper, a spaceship in the novel Pushing Ice by Alastair Reynolds